Christian Bauer (born 29 August 1970) is a German sport shooter who competed in the 2000 Summer Olympics.

References

1970 births
Living people
German male sport shooters
ISSF rifle shooters
Olympic shooters of Germany
Shooters at the 2000 Summer Olympics